PDB may refer to:

 Chess Problem Database Server (PDB Server)
 1,4-Dichlorobenzene (paradichlorobenzene)
 Party of German-speaking Belgians,, a political party and predecessor of the ProDG
 PDB (Palm OS), a container format for record databases in Palm OS, Garnet OS and Access Linux Platform
 Pee Dee Belemnite, a standard for stable Carbon-13 and Oxygen-18 isotopes; see 
 Pluggable database, such as an Oracle Database in a multitenancy environment
 Potato dextrose broth, a common microbiological growth media
 Pousette-Dart Band
 President's Daily Brief or Briefing or Bulletin, a top-secret intelligence document produced each morning for the U.S. President
 Program database, a file format for storing debugging information
 Promised Day Brigade, an Iraqi Shia organisation
 Protein Data Bank
 Protein Data Bank (file format)
 Python Debugger, see Python (programming language)